Reverend Francis Godolphin Pelham, 5th Earl of Chichester (18 October 1844 – 21 April 1905), known as Hon. Francis Pelham until 1902, was a British cleric and nobleman.

Life

Pelham was the son of Henry Pelham, 3rd Earl of Chichester and Lady Mary Brudenell. He was educated at Eton and Trinity College, Cambridge, where he was a sporting 'blue', representing the university in athletics and cricket and playing cricket for Sussex before graduating with a BA in 1868. Pursuing a career in the church, he was rector of Lambeth from 1884 to 1894, rector of Buckhurst Hill, Essex from 1894 to 1900 and Vicar of Great Yarmouth from 1900 to 1903. He was also a Canon of Bangor Cathedral.

Pelham succeeded his elder brother Walter Pelham (who died childless) as Earl of Chichester in May 1902.

He was also a member of the Wanderers amateur football club.

Marriage and issue
On 4 August 1870 he married Alice Carr Glyn, daughter of George Glyn, 1st Baron Wolverton, and Marianne Grenfell. They had issue, including Jocelyn who succeeded to the title.

References

External links

The Peerage.com
Cricket career profile

1844 births
1905 deaths
19th-century English Anglican priests
Earls of Chichester
Ordained peers
People educated at Eton College
Alumni of Trinity College, Cambridge
Sussex cricketers
Cambridge University cricketers
English cricketers
Marylebone Cricket Club cricketers
Wanderers F.C. players
Francis
Gentlemen of the South cricketers
Association footballers not categorized by position
English footballers